Raymond Robert Williams (born 25 October 1927) is an English former professional footballer who played as an inside forward. He made appearances in the English Football League for Wrexham and Shrewsbury Town.

References

1927 births
Possibly living people
Liverpool F.C. players
Wrexham A.F.C. players
Shrewsbury Town F.C. players
English footballers
Association football forwards
English Football League players